TDM Fabric to Framer Interface is abbreviated as TDM. Some commonly used TDM variants include:

 TFI-4
 TFI-5

See also
 Optical Internetworking Forum

Multiplexing